Trithuria is a genus of small aquatic herb, which represent the only members of the family Hydatellaceae found in India, Australia, and New Zealand. Most of the 12 formally characterised species of Trithuria are found in Australia, with the exception of T. inconspicua and T. konkanensis, which are found in New Zealand and India, respectively.  Until genetic testing proved otherwise, these plants were believed to be Monocots related to the grasses (Poaceae).  They are unique in being the only plants besides Lacandonia schizmatica and L. braziliana in which the stamens are in the center of the flower while the pistels are circled in a ring around them. 

These diminutive, moss-like, aquatic plants are the closest living relatives of the two closely related families Nymphaeaceae (water-lilies) and Cabombaceae. Together, these three families compose the order Nymphaeales in the APG III system of flowering plant classification. Trithuria (Hydatellaceae) diverged from the rest of Nymphaeales soon after Nymphaeales diverged from its sister taxon, which comprises all of the flowering plants except the two orders Nymphaeales and Amborellales.

Taxonomy

The genus Hydatella was recently subsumed into Trithuria based on the following morphological synapomorphies:
 lack of a vascular cambium,
 lack of pericyclic sclerenchyma,
 anomocytic stomata,
 truncate anther connective,
 boat-shaped pollen,
 inner integument with two cell layers,
 palisade exotesta,
 seed operculum formed by cell enlargement in the inner integument,
 perisperm and
 hypogeal germination.

Species and distribution

 Trithuria austinensis D.D.Sokoloff - Western Australia
 Trithuria australis (Diels) D.D.Sokoloff - Western Australia
 Trithuria bibracteata Stapf ex D.A.Cooke - Western Australia
 Trithuria cookeana D.D.Sokoloff, Remizowa, T.D.Macfarl. & Rudall - Northern Territory of Australia
 Trithuria cowieana D.D.Sokoloff - Northern Territory 
 Trithuria filamentosa Rodway - Tasmania
 Trithuria fitzgeraldii D.D.Sokoloff, I.Marques, T.D.Macfarl., Rudall & S.W.Graham - Western Australia
 Trithuria inconspicua Cheeseman - North Island of New Zealand
 Trithuria konkanensis S.R.Yadav & Janarth. - Maharashtra
 Trithuria lanterna D.A.Cooke - Northern Territory, Western Australia, Queensland
 Trithuria occidentalis Benth. - Western Australia
 Trithuria polybracteata D.A.Cooke ex D.D.Sokoloff, Remizowa, T.D.Macfarl. & Rudall - Western Australia
 Trithuria submersa Hook.f. - Western Australia, South Australia, Victoria, New South Wales, Tasmania

References

Nymphaeales genera
Aquatic plants
Nymphaeales